Magtymguly Avenue, transliterated from Russian as Makhtumkuli, is an avenue in Ashgabat, Turkmenistan. It is considered to be the longest and most prominent avenue in the capital

Origins and Description
When it was originally created in the early 1880s, Magtymguly Avenue, then named Merv Prospect, ran through the entire city and then merged with the road leading to Merv. It was subsequently renamed Kuropatkin Prospect in honor of General Aleksey Kuropatkin. Later, during the Soviet period, the avenue was known as Freedom Prospect, on which were hosted military and civilian parades on the occasion of many holidays, with most being held on Revolution Day (November 7), Victory Day (May 9), and International Workers Day (May 1). From 1953 to 1961, following Joseph Stalin's death, the street was named Stalin Prospect. During the period of Niyazov's rule when Ashgabat streets were assigned four-digit numbers, Magtymguly was given the number 2033.

In 1971, a monument designed by architects V. Vysotin and V. Kutumov to the 16th century Turkmen poet Magtymguly Pyragy (who would later become the avenue's namesake), was installed on the avenue on the site of the demolished Bahá'í temple.  Following the dissolution of the USSR in December 1991, the thoroughfare was immediately renamed Magtymguly Avenue in honor of Magtymguly Pyragy by order of President Saparmurat Niyazov. Over the next two to three years, a large fountain was installed on the avenue, and maple and acacia trees also appeared along its path. On this avenue in October 1992 the first Turkmen Independence Day Parade took place, which saw troops of the Ashgabat Garrison of the newly formed Armed Forces of Turkmenistan march past the reviewing stand from which President Niyazov observed the parade.

Landmarks and Buildings along the avenue
State Russian Drama Theatre named after Pushkin
Turkmen State Institute of Transport and Communications
Main Drama Theater named by Saparmurat Turkmenbashi
State Circus of Turkmenistan
Ashgabat Cinema

Inspiration Alley
Ashgabat Park
Ministry of Internal Affairs
Ministry of National Security
State Border Service
"Gul Zemin" Mall
"Tashkent" Park
Turkmen-Turkish Commercial Bank
Ashgabat Vine Facility
Cultural Center of Iran
Central State Archive of Turkmenistan
Institute of the Caspian Sea
U.S Embassy
Ashgabat Brewery
Central Physiology Scientific and Clinical Hospital
Bayram Han Park

Monuments 
 Alabay Statue

See also
Archabil Avenue
Bitarap Turkmenistan Avenue
Saparmurat Turkmenbashi Avenue
Independence Square
Galkynysh Square

References

Streets in Ashgabat
Transport in Ashgabat